Booker T. Washington High School, also known as Booker T or BTW, is a public high school located in Norfolk, Virginia. It is administered by Norfolk Public Schools system. The school colors are maroon, white and gold. The school is called “The Mighty Booker T” and the “Fighting Bookers" in Norfolk, Virginia.

History
Booker T. Washington High School was named in honor of Booker T. Washington who was an African-American educator, author, orator, and adviser to presidents of the United States. In April 1911, when the Norfolk School Board agreed to allow one year of high school at the site of John T. West Elementary School. For each of the next three years, a grade was added culminating in the State Board of Educations approval. Thus Washington became Virginia first accredited public high school for African-Americans.

In 1915 the high school was moved to Princess Anne Road, where Norfolk Mission College had been located and adopted the name Booker T. Washington High School. In 1917, Booker T. Washington High School became Virginia’s first accredited public high school for African Americans. A new building opened on Virginia Beach Boulevard in 1924. There were 1,750 students in grades 7–12 and 63 teachers. The school became known as The Mighty Booker T, and the athletic teams were nicknamed The Fighting Bookers.

In 1974, the school moved into a new facility, which was built for $8 million. The school marching band Marching Bookers was the first African-American band to perform in a Televised presidential inauguration parade, when they performed for President Harry Truman in 1949. The band also performed in both of President Eisenhower's inauguration parades. They also performed in the 2014 Virginia governor inauguration parade.

Alma mater
Composed by: Phyllis Hoggard and Wanza Sutton 
Class of 1960

Notable alumni
 Michael Basnight, NFL player
 Aline Elizabeth Black, educator
 Tony Brothers, NBA referee
 Don Carey, cornerback, Norfolk State University, 2009 NFL Draft Pick
 Roy Ebron, ABA–NBA merger (ABA).
 Samuel L. Green Jr., pastor and bishop
 Bruce Smith, Pro Football Hall of Fame defensive end
 Antoine Thompson, cornerback, Nevada-Reno, signed with the St. Louis Rams in 2010
 Wilson Washington, played for two seasons in the National Basketball Association
 Pernell Whitaker, several-time World Boxing Champion
 Jack Williams, cornerback, Kent College, 2008 NFL Draft Pick
 [[Sam Allen (Former Negro League baseball player)

See also
 List of things named after Booker T. Washington

References

External links
 

Educational institutions established in 1911
Public high schools in Virginia
Schools in Norfolk, Virginia
1911 establishments in Virginia